Doe Run may refer to:

Companies
Doe Run Company

Places

United States
Doe Run, Maryland
Doe Run, Missouri
Doe Run, Pennsylvania

See also
Doe Run Creek (disambiguation)